is the 4th single by Mayu Watanabe, released in Japan on July 10, 2013.

Release 
The single was released in five versions: Complete Limited Edition, Time Period Limited Edition, Limited Edition A, Limited Edition B, and Regular Edition.  An illustration contest was held on the website pixiv for the Complete Limited Edition.  It features the "Rogoku Yuenchi kara Mayuyu wo Sukue!!! in Tokyo Dome City Attractions".  The other editions were done in collaboration with Oreskaband and was directed by Fantasista Utamaro.

Track listing

Regular Edition

Bonus (all editions) 
 Mayuyu Mystery-solving Game Card (10 types in total, one included at randon)
 Entry ticket for a premium lottery

Charts

References

External links 
 Mayu Watanabe's discography
 

2013 singles
Songs with lyrics by Yasushi Akimoto
Mayu Watanabe songs
Sony Music Entertainment Japan singles